The Groundhog Day gale was a severe winter storm that hit the Northeastern United States and southeastern Canada on February 2 (Groundhog Day), 1976.

Meteorologist synopsis
An upper-level low was stationary across the Desert Southwest of the United States, on January 28.  A system in the northern branch of the Westerlies known as a Saskatchewan Screamer, similar to an Alberta clipper but originating as a frontal wave in the next Canadian province to the east, moved east-southeast across Canada beginning on January 30, luring the system in the United States eastward. The cyclones merged by February 2, becoming a significant storm over New England before lifting northward through Quebec into the Davis Strait. At this time, maximum sustained winds reached 164 kilometers per hour (102 mph) in coastal areas (equal to a Category 2 hurricane on the Saffir-Simpson hurricane scale), with wind gusts of up to 188 kilometers per hour (116 mph). By February 6, this extratropical cyclone was absorbed by another system in the northern Canadian archipelago.

Effects in the United States

Maine
Winds gusted to 60 knots (69 mph) in Rockland and 100 knots (115 mph) at Southwest Harbor. Blizzard conditions were experienced for a few hours as the cyclone moved up into Canada. The storm caused extensive damage in many areas. Although many trees were blown down by the storm, many more were killed after large amounts of seawater were blown inland. Coastal flooding was seen from Brunswick to Eastport. A tidal surge went up the Penobscot River, flooding Bangor, Maine, for three hours around midday. At 11:15 am, waters began rising on the river and within 15 minutes had risen a total of  flooding downtown. About 200 cars were submerged and office workers were stranded until waters receded. There were no reported deaths during this unusual flash flood.

Massachusetts

New York
Cyclonic flow and cold air around the backside of this system led to significant Lake effect snows for areas downwind of the Great Lakes.

Vermont
Burlington set a daily snow record on February 2 when 6.5 inches fell.

Canada effects
Significant damage occurred in southern New Brunswick, especially to the city of  Saint John. Saint John experienced winds of 188 km/h (116 mph). Power and communications lines were also knocked out. The tides along the coast were increased due to the convergence of anomalistic, synodical, and tropical monthly tidal cycles peaking simultaneously (known as Saros); a once in 18-year event. Damage was estimated in the tens of millions of dollars. The lighthouse at Fish Fluke Point was wrecked and subsequently abandoned. The aftermath of this storm was worsened by a severe cold snap that followed the day after.

See also
Cyclogenesis
Surface weather analysis
Tide

References

Blizzards in the United States
Blizzards in Canada
Nor'easters
Floods in the United States
1976 meteorology
1976 natural disasters
1976 natural disasters in the United States
1976 in Canada
Weather events in the United States
February 1976 events in North America
Groundhog Day